Castle Butte is a populated place situated in Navajo County, Arizona, United States.

History
Castle Butte's population was 15 in the 1960 census.

References

Populated places in Navajo County, Arizona